Gerd Albrecht (19 July 1935 – 2 February 2014) was a German conductor.

Biography
Albrecht was born in Essen, the son of the musicologist Hans Albrecht (1902–1961).  He studied music in Kiel and in Hamburg, where his teachers included Wilhelm Brückner-Rüggeberg.  He was a first-prize winner at the International Besançon Competition for Young Conductors at age 22.  His first post was as a repetiteur at the Stuttgart State Opera.  Later, he became Senior Kapellmeister at the Staatstheater Mainz, and Generalmusikdirektor in Lübeck. He also held posts at the Deutsche Oper Berlin, the Tonhalle-Orchester Zürich and the Hamburg State Opera.

His work in contemporary opera included conducting Aribert Reimann's Lear in both its world premiere and its United States premiere, as well as making the first commercial recording of the opera.  His other commercial recordings include Robert Schumann's Genoveva and Manfred, and the first commercial recording of Hans Werner Henze's Gogo no Eiko (The Sailor Who Fell from Grace with the Sea) in its revised Japanese-language version.

Albrecht died at age 78 on 2 February 2014 in Berlin.

Czech Philharmonic controversy
In 1991, the musicians of the Czech Philharmonic picked Albrecht as its principal conductor, the first non-Czech conductor named to the post, for a tenure scheduled to last seven years beginning in 1994. The orchestra had played a part in protesting the Soviet domination of their country and reorganized as a self-governing entity.  The musician's selection of Albrecht effectively meant the replacing of Czech conductor Jiří Bělohlávek, who then in 1992 resigned  from his position early. Consequently, by the time that he took up the post, the orchestra was already somewhat riven. Albrecht proved effective in improving the Czech Philharmonic's finances and at raising its international profile with foreign tours.  He is also acknowledged to have been a musical success, and his recordings with the orchestra included music of Ervin Schulhoff. However, a series of political conflicts led to his early resignation.

In 1994, the Czech Philharmonic was invited to perform at the Vatican in a concert celebrating reconciliation between Roman Catholics and Jews. However, the invitation was to play under the American conductor Gilbert Levine, already known for his close relationship with the Vatican under Pope John Paul II and subsequently for the telecast, Papal Concert to Commemorate the Holocaust. Albrecht vetoed the engagement, ostensibly because the orchestra was too busy, although other speculation on the actual reason for the refusal was that the Vatican did not invite Albrecht.

Czech president Václav Havel became involved, telling Albrecht that his actions were damaging the orchestra.  The situation steadily deteriorated, with Albrecht painting himself in press interviews as a victim of racism and anti-German feeling and for being expected personally to atone for all past German misdeeds. He also claimed that his phone was bugged.  Havel retaliated in the media with his own claims.  Albrecht and Bělohlávek collaborated for the 100th anniversary concert, each conducting half of it, on January 4, 1996, but Havel was conspicuously absent and members of the orchestra showed their allegiances when the time came for applause. Albrecht resigned from this post a month later asserting that his musical authority had been undermined.

With the Czech Philharmonic, Albrecht conducted the first commercial recording of Dvořák's opera Dimitrij.

Other conducting work
From 2000 to 2004, he was principal conductor of the Danish National Symphony Orchestra, with which he made commercial recordings for such labels as Chandos.  In 2003, he caused controversy when he spoke from the podium at one concert to protest the US invasion of Iraq.  He later apologized for the incident. In Japan, he served as principal conductor of Yomiuri Nippon Symphony Orchestra from 1998 to 2007, and became its conductor laureate after 2007.

Recordings of complete operas
Berlioz, troyens, Les, 
Albrecht/Dernesch/Ludwig/Lilowa/Chauvet/Schöne/Ghiuselev, 
1976, live in Vienna, Gala

Busoni, Arlecchino, 
Albrecht/Bellamy/Wörle/Lorenz/Pape/Lika, 
1992, Capriccio

Busoni, Turandot, 
Albrecht/Plech/Schreckenbach/Protschka/Pape, 
1992, Capriccio

Dvořák, Armida, 
Albrecht/Borowska/Ochman/Kříž/Fortune/Daniluk, 
1995, live in Prague, Orfeo

Dvořák, Devil and Kate (Čert a Káča), The, 
Albrecht/Romanko/Breedt/Straka/Mikuláš, 
2007, Orfeo

Dvořák, Dimitrij, 
Albrecht/Hajóssyová/Ághová/Vodička/Kusnjer/Mikuláš, 
1989, Supraphon

Dvořák, Jakobín, 
Albrecht/Danková/Ághová/Lorenz/Lehotsky/Bronikowski/Stephinger, 
2003, Orfeo

Dvořák, King and Collier (Král a uhlíř), 
Albrecht/Ághová/Breedt/Lehotsky/Schäfer/Jenis/Mikuláš, 
2005, live in Cologne, Orfeo

Dvořák, Svatební košile, 
Albrecht/Ághová/Protschka/Kusnjer, 
1991, live in Hamburg, Orfeo

Dvořák, Vanda, 
Albrecht/Romanko/Tchistiakova/Breedt/Straka/Kusnjer/Kusnjer/Daniluk, 
1999, Orfeo

Gurlitt, Soldaten, 
Albrecht/Müller/Barainsky/Breedt/Harper/Mohr/Burt, 
1998, Orfeo

Gurlitt, Wozzeck, 
Albrecht/Lindsley/Wottrich/Wörle/Scharinger/Hermann, 
1993, Crystal

Halévy, Juive, La, 
Albrecht/Ghazarian/Tokody/Carreras/Merritt/Siepi, 
1981, live in Vienna, abridged, Legato

Henze, Bassarids, The, 
Albrecht/Lindsley/Armstrong/Riegel/Tear/Schmidt-A/Murray-W/Burt, 
1986, Koch

Henze, verratene Meer (Gogo no Eiko), Das, 
Albrecht/Midorikawa/Takahashi/Mihara, 
2006, live in Salzburg, Orfeo

Hindemith, Cardillac, 
Albrecht/Schweizer/Schunk/Nimsgern/Stamm, 
1988, Wergo

Hindemith, Mathis der Maler, 
Albrecht/Rossmanith/Hass/Protschka/Kruse/Hermann/Stamm, 
1989, Wergo

Hindemith, Mörder, Hoffnung der Frauen, 
Albrecht/Schnaut/Grundheber, 
1986, Wergo

Hindemith, Nusch-Nuschi, Das, 
Albrecht/Schweizer/Lindsley/Sieber/Schreckenbach/Gahmlich/Knutson/Stamm/Halem, 
1987, Wergo

Hindemith, Sancta Susanna, 
Albrecht/Donath/Schnaut/Schreckenbach, 
1984, Wergo

Janáček, Osud, 
Albrecht/Ághová/Straka, 
1995, live in Prague, Orfeo

Krenek, Karl V, 
Albrecht/Jurinac/Ciesinski-Kr/Schwarz/Moser-T/Melchert/Schreier/Adam, 
1980, live in Salzburg, Philips

Liebermann-R, Freispruch für Medea, 
Albrecht/Pollet/Spingler/Kowalski/Haugland/Mist, 
1995, live in Hamburg, Musiques Suisses

Marschner, Hans Heiling, 
Albrecht/Zeumer/Schröder-Feinen/Gilles/Siukola/Weikl, 
1972, live in Torino, Voce

Massenet, Thérèse, 
Albrecht/Baltsa/Araiza/Fortune, 
1981, live in Rome, Orfeo

Mercadante, giuramento, Il, 
Albrecht/Bernard/Baltsa/Carreras/Kerns, 
1974, live in Berlin, House of Opera

Mercadante, giuramento, Il, 
Albrecht/Zampieri/Baltsa/Domingo/Kerns, 
1979, live in Vienna, Orfeo

Meyerbeer, africaine, L’, 
Albrecht/Brunner/Arroyo/Lamberti/Milnes, 
1977, live in Munich, Myto

Puccini, Gianni Schicchi, 
Albrecht/Ghazarian/Lilowa/Ramiro/Berry, 
1979, live in Vienna, Orfeo

Puccini, Gianni Schicchi, 
Albrecht/Rossmanith/Dernesch/Ombuena Valls/Duesing, 
1995, DVD, Hamburg, Encore

Puccini, Suor Angelica, 
Albrecht/Lorengar/Meyer, 
1979, live in Vienna, Bella Voce

Puccini, Suor Angelica, 
Albrecht/Gallardo-Domâs/Dernesch, 
1995, DVD, Hamburg, Encore

Puccini, tabarro, Il, 
Albrecht/Zschau/Atlantov/Bruson, 
1979, live in Vienna, Bella Voce

Puccini, tabarro, Il, 
Albrecht/Daniels/Margison/Grundheber, 
1995, DVD, Hamburg, Encore

Reimann, Lear, 
Albrecht/Varady/Dernesch/Lorand/Knutson/Götz/Holm/Boysen/Fischer-Dieskau/Plöcker, 
1978, live in Munich, DG

Schnittke, D Johann Fausten, Historia von, 
Albrecht/Schwarz/Raunig/Büchner/Lorenz/Freier, 
1995, live in Hamburg, RCA

Schoeck, Penthesilea, 
Albrecht/Gessendorf/Marsh/Dernesch/Lipovšek/Hiestermann/Adam, 
1982, live in Salzburg, Orfeo

Schönberg, Erwartung, 
Albrecht/Nielsen, 
2003, Chandos

Schreker, ferne Klang, Der, 
Albrecht/Schnaut/Juon/Wörle/Moser-T/Hermann/Nimsgern, 
1990, Capriccio

Schreker, Gezeichneten, Die, 
Albrecht/Martin-Ja/Riegel/Becht/Adam/Meven, 
1984, live in Salzburg, Orfeo

Schreker, Schatzgräber, Der, 
Albrecht/Schnaut/Kruse/Protschka/Haage/Helm/Stamm, 
1989, live in Hamburg, abridged, Capriccio

Schumann, Genoveva, 
Albrecht/Faulkner/Behle-R/Lewis-K/Stamm/Titus/Schultz, 
1992, live in Hamburg, Orfeo

Spohr, Jessonda, 
Albrecht/Studer/Soffel/Moser-T/Hermann/Hölle, 
1985, live in Vienna, Voce

Spohr, Jessonda, 
Albrecht/Varady/Behle-R/Moser-T/Fischer-Dieskau/Moll, 
1990, live in Hamburg, abridged, Orfeo

Spontini, Olimpie, 
Albrecht/Varady/Toczyska/Tagliavini/Fischer-Dieskau/Fortune, 
1984, Orfeo

Ullmann, zerbrochene Krug, Der, 
Albrecht/Barainsky/Breedt/Künzli/Hermann, 
1997, Orfeo

Wolf, Corregidor, Der, 
Albrecht/Donath/Soffel/Hollweg/Fischer-Dieskau/Halem, 
1985, Koch Schwann

Zemlinsky, florentinische Tragödie, Eine, 
Albrecht/Soffel/Riegel/Sarabia, 
1984, Schwann

Zemlinsky, König Kandaules, Der, 
Albrecht/Warren/O’Neal/Pederson, 
1996, live in Hamburg, Capriccio

Zemlinsky, Traumgörge, Der, 
Albrecht/Martin-Ja/Protschka, 
1988, Capriccio

Zemlinsky, Zwerg, Der, 
Albrecht/Nielsen/Studer/Haldas/Riegel/Weller, 
1983, Schwann

References

External links

 Semperoper English-language biography of Gerd Albrecht

1935 births
2014 deaths
Musicians from Essen
German male conductors (music)
Officers Crosses of the Order of Merit of the Federal Republic of Germany
20th-century German conductors (music)
20th-century German male musicians